Jock Zonfrillo (born Barry Zonfrillo, 4 August 1976) is a Scottish television presenter and former chef currently based in Melbourne, Australia.
He is the founder of The Orana Foundation and one of the current MasterChef Australia judges alongside Andy Allen and Melissa Leong.

Career

Apprentice 
Barry Zonfrillo started working in kitchens as a dishwasher part-time at the age of 13, while still at school. He left school aged 15 and started an apprenticeship in the kitchens of The Turnberry Hotel, after which he worked at the Arkle Restaurant in Chester. Zonfrillo then worked for Marco Pierre White before travelling to Australia for 12 months to work at Restaurant 41 in Sydney On returning to the UK, Zonfrillo was appointed to his first head chef position aged 22 at The Tresanton Hotel, Cornwall, England.

Australia 
Zonfrillo returned to Australia in January 2000 as the head chef at Restaurant 41 in Sydney. In November 2013, he opened Restaurant Orana and Street ADL in Adelaide, replacing Street ADL with Bistro Blackwood in September 2017. In August 2017, Restaurant Orana was named Australia's 2018 Restaurant of the Year by Gourmet Traveller Magazine; the same year Zonfrillo was named Australia's 2018 Hottest Chef in The Australian. In October 2018, Orana was named Australia's 2019 Restaurant of the Year by the Good Food Guide.

Closures 
Zonfrillo opened Nonna Mallozzi in December 2018. He closed it in July 2019 after posting losses exceeding $140,000 in the time it was open. Late 2019 Bistro Blackwood closed, followed by Orana in March 2020. The combined debts amounted to approximately $3.2 million. Zonfrillo's long-term restaurant manager, Greta Wohlstadt, had resigned in the weeks leading up to the closure of Orana.

MasterChef 
In October 2019, Zonfrillo was announced as one of the new judges for MasterChef Australia, alongside Melissa Leong and Andy Allen. At that time, he remarked to an Adelaide newspaper that nothing would change for Restaurant Orana and Bistro Blackwood: "You’ll see me probably just as often (...) It’s a 50-minute flight from Melbourne and the restaurant is only a 15-minute drive from the airport so I can be standing in Orana very quickly.”   Some weeks later, Bistro Blackwood closed, followed by Orana in March 2020. In July 2020, Zonfrillo was announced as one of the judges for Junior Masterchef Australia in 2020.

Other business 
In July 2021, Zonfrillo commenced selling purportedly handmade bracelets with skulls on them for up to $500 each, under the brand Caim.  At the time, Zonfrillo remarked: "Caim is Scottish Gaelic, pronounced kyem. It’s not religious – it’s an invisible circle of protection that you draw around your body with your hand, to remind you of being safe and loved, even in the darkest times.”

Controversies

Assault and bankruptcy 
In 2002, Zonfrillo deliberately set fire to Martin Krammer, an apprentice chef in his kitchen, for working too slowly.  Subsequently, damages in excess of $75,000 were awarded against Zonfrillo. Later in May 2007 Zonfrillo was declared bankrupt after a creditors petition from Martin Krammer was successful in the Federal Magistrates Court. According to Krammer, "He [Zonfrillo] never paid me a cent".

The Orana Foundation
In 2016, Zonfrillo started The Orana Foundation, to preserve historical cooking techniques and ingredients of the Indigenous Australians. The Orana Foundation was awarded the Good Food Guide Food For Good Award in October 2017. Questions were subsequently raised in the media regarding Zonfrillo’s management of the charity. Zonfrillo launched defamation proceedings in the Federal Court of Australia in September 2020 against Nationwide News relating to an article concerning the Orana Foundation. Nationwide News settled the court case. An apology was printed in The Australian newspaper on 17 December 2020 and published on their website.

Restaurant Orana
On 5 October 2020, Restaurant Orana (The Living Room Bar Pty Ltd) and Bistro Blackwood (Blackwood Bistro Pty Ltd) entered into voluntary administration, with substantial unpaid debts, amounting to approximately $3.2 million. A preliminary report filed by the Voluntary Administrators with ASIC in October 2020, recorded that initial investigations were being undertaken into whether the restaurant companies were trading while insolvent, if there had been unfair preferences or potential breaches of director duties, and concerning related party loans. Zonfrillo also had to sell his family home in the Adelaide Hills after the closure of Orana.

Memoir
On 28 July 2021, Simon & Schuster published Zonfrillo's controversial memoir, Last Shot.  A subsequent feature in The Sydney Morning Herald questioned his stories, notably his claims of having visited "hundreds of Indigenous communities", as well of the stories of his alleged drug use. Marco Pierre White, referred to as a father figure in the book, stated that "almost everything he has written about me is untrue". Simon & Schuster replied that the book was "a historical account written from the personal knowledge of the subject writing it.”

Personal life 

Zonfrillo was born in Glasgow, Scotland. His mother's family is Scottish from Dalmellington, Ayrshire while his father is Italian from Scauri, Italy. He attended Belmont Academy in Ayr, Scotland.

On 1 January 2017, Zonfrillo married his third wife, Lauren Fried.  The couple met on Twitter in October 2014. In February 2018, Fried and Zonfrillo had a son who was born two months premature and weighed only 1.2 kgs.

After the closure of his restaurants, Zonfrillo and his family relocated to Melbourne around March 2020.  They now reside in the suburb of Carlton. Fried and Zonfrillo had a daughter in October 2020.

Recognitions 
2014 South Australian Best New Restaurant and South Australian Restaurant of the Year - The Advertiser Food Awards
2015 South Australian Restaurant of the Year - The Advertiser Food Awards
2015 Chef of The Year - Restaurant & Catering Awards
2015 and 2016 Australia's Hot 50 Restaurants - The Australian
2017 Hottest Chef & Hottest South Australian Restaurant - The Australian
2017 Food for Good Award - The Good Food Guide
2018 Australian Restaurant of the Year - Gourmet Traveller Magazine
2018 Australia's Hottest Chef - The Australian
2018 Australian Food for Good Award - The Good Food Guide
2018 Basque Culinary World Prize - Basque Culinary Center
2019 Australian Restaurant of the Year - The Good Food Guide.

Television 
In 2014 Zonfrillo appeared on MasterChef Australia (series 6).
In 2014 Zonfrillo hosted 'Nomad Chef' which was filmed in 10 countries across the world and aired in over 180 countries
In 2015 Zonfrillo hosted 'Restaurant Revolution' on the Seven Network in Australia
In 2016 Zonfrillo hosted 'Chef Exchange' for Qingdao TV (QTV) in China and South Australia and went on to film a second series in 2017.
In 2017 Zonfrillo hosted the second season of 'Chef Exchange'
In 2018 Zonfrillo appeared on MasterChef Australia (series 10).
In 2019 Zonfrillo appeared on MasterChef Australia (series 11).
 In 2020 Zonfrillo hosted MasterChef Australia (series 12).
 In 2020 Zonfrillo hosted Junior MasterChef Australia (series 3).
 In 2021 Zonfrillo hosted MasterChef Australia (series 13).
 In 2022 Zonfrillo hosted MasterChef Australia (series 14).

References 

Living people
Australian television chefs
1976 births
Scottish emigrants to Australia